The Edward Gorey House, also known as the Elephant House, is the home on Cape Cod in which Edward Gorey—author, illustrator, puppeteer, and playwright—lived and worked from 1986 until his death in 2000. The house currently serves as a museum celebrating Gorey's life and work.

Gorey had a respect and passion for animals, cats in particular. The activities of the house, from art education to interactive exhibits, reflect Gorey's support of animal welfare.

Description 
Gorey collected all sorts of objects; some of them discarded objects found at the side of the road. He arranged and displayed such items on his porch and in the rooms of the house. He also had a large collection of books and an overflowing library.

Elephant House is also notable for the presence of a large southern magnolia tree in its yard, a species not usually found so far north.

Gallery 
The Museum has a display of the Edward Gorey binding project.

Preservation 
A 2002 grant from the Highland Street Foundation allowed the house to be purchased and the museum to be established.

References

External links 
 
 Information from The Historical Society of Old Yarmouth
 Edward Gorey Documentary, 2022

Biographical museums in Massachusetts
Edward Gorey
Historic house museums in Massachusetts
Houses in Barnstable County, Massachusetts
Gorey, Edward
Museums in Barnstable County, Massachusetts
Yarmouth, Massachusetts
Gorey, Edward House